Sandra Veralí Tamacas Romero (born 8 January 1993) is a Salvadoran footballer who plays as a midfielder. She has been a member of the El Salvador women's national team.

Early life
Tamacas was born in La Paz Department.

Club career
Tamacas has played for Alianza FC in El Salvador.

International career
Tamacas represented El Salvador at the 2010 CONCACAF Women's U-17 Championship qualification and 2012 CONCACAF Women's U-20 Championship qualifying. She capped at senior level during two CONCACAF Women's Olympic Qualifying Tournament qualifications (2012 and 2020) and the 2018 CONCACAF Women's Championship qualification.

See also
List of El Salvador women's international footballers

References 

1993 births
Living people
People from La Paz Department (El Salvador)
Salvadoran women's footballers
Women's association football midfielders
El Salvador women's international footballers